Cellulosilyticum lentocellum  is an anaerobic and spore-forming bacterium from the genus Cellulosilyticum, which has been isolated from sediments from the River Don in Scotland. C. lentocellum produces cellobiose 2-epimerase.

References 

Lachnospiraceae
Bacteria described in 1987